Jagdfliegerführer Bretagne (Fighter Leader Brittany) was formed September 1943 in Rennes from Jagdfliegerführer 4, subordinated to the II. Jagdkorps. The headquarters was located at Rennes. The unit was disbanded on August 31, 1944

Commanding officers

Fliegerführer
Oberstleutnant Walter Oesau, September 1943 - 11 November 1943
Oberst Dr. Erich Mix, 1 December 1943 - August 1944

References
Notes

Luftwaffe Fliegerführer
Military units and formations established in 1943
Military units and formations disestablished in 1944